25/8 may refer to:

 , an approximation of pi used in ancient Babylon
 August 25, used in European style date
 The original title of the 2010 American film My Soul to Take
 "25/8" (song), a song by Mary J. Blige
 "25/8", a song by Bad Bunny on his 2020 album YHLQMDLG